Jérémie Kisling (born Jérémie Tschanz) is a singer songwriter born on 27 February 1976 in Lausanne, Switzerland. He explored several ways of expression until he decided to start singing. His songs describe a melancholic, fragile and impishly humorous universe. His deliberately old fashioned arrangements of vintage synths (Moog, Korg, Wurlitzer), insisting trumpets and light guitar tunes create genuinely enchanting harmonies.

His second album, 'Le Ours' peaked at 59 on the Swiss charts. His third album, 'Antimatière', debuted at 39 on the Swiss charts.

Discography 

Monsieur Obsolète, 2003
Le Ours, 2005
Antimatière, 2009
Tout m'échappe, 2013
Malhabiles, 2016

References

External links
 Jérémie Kisling's website

1976 births
Living people
French-language singers of Switzerland
21st-century Swiss  male singers